The 2016 Honolulu mayoral election determined the Mayor of the City and County of Honolulu for the full term commencing in January 2017. As in the previous several elections, the Honolulu metro and its cost overruns was a major topic of the campaign.

Incumbent Democratic Mayor Kirk Caldwell ran for re-election to a second term. A non-partisan blanket primary was held on Saturday, August 13, 2016. As no candidate received an outright majority of the vote in the primary, the top-two finishers, Caldwell and former Republican U.S. Representative Charles Djou, advanced to the general election runoff on Tuesday, November 8, 2016; Caldwell won with 52 percent of the vote, to Djou's 48 percent.

Candidates
 Kirk Caldwell, incumbent Mayor of Honolulu (voter registration: Democratic)
 Charles Djou, former U.S. Representative and former Honolulu City Councilman (voter registration: Republican)

Eliminated
Kurt Baker
Zachary Burd
Ernest Caravalho
Peter Carlisle, former Mayor of Honolulu (voter registration: Independent)
Lawrence Friedman
Tim Garry
Ronald Hochuli
Lillian Hong
Angela Kaaihue (ran instead for, and received the Republican nomination as, U.S. Representative for Hawaii's 2nd congressional district)
Mike Powers
Joseph Wargo

Endorsements

Primary

Polling

Primary results

General election

Results
Caldwell won reelection on November 8, 2016, in the runoff with Djou, 52.2% to 47.8%. Though both candidates supported the municipal rail project, substantial cost overruns were an issue, as was Caldwell's alleged interference with the Ethics Commission.

References

External links
Official campaign websites
 Charles Djou for Mayor

2016 Hawaii elections
Mayoral elections in Honolulu
2016 United States mayoral elections
November 2016 events in the United States